Phyllopsora is a genus of lichenized fungi in the family Ramalinaceae. It was circumscribed by Swiss botanist Johannes Müller Argoviensis in 1894.

The characteristics of a fossilized Phyllopsora, Phyllopsora dominicana, found in Dominican amber, suggests that the main distinguishing features of the genus have remained unchanged for tens of millions of years.

Species

, Species Fungorum accepts 49 species of Phyllopsora:
Phyllopsora africana 
Phyllopsora amazonica 
Phyllopsora atrocarpa  – Peru
Phyllopsora buettneri 
Phyllopsora borbonica 
Phyllopsora breviuscula 
Phyllopsora castaneocincta 
Phyllopsora catervisorediata  – India
Phyllopsora chodatinica  – Australia
Phyllopsora cinchonarum 
Phyllopsora cognata 
Phyllopsora concinna 
Phyllopsora conwayensis  – Australia
Phyllopsora corallina 
Phyllopsora dodongensis  – South Korea
Phyllopsora dolichospora 
Phyllopsora dominicana 
Phyllopsora foliata 
Phyllopsora foliatella  – Australia
Phyllopsora furfuracea 
Phyllopsora furfurella 
Phyllopsora glaucella 
Phyllopsora glaucescens  – Peru
Phyllopsora gossypina 
Phyllopsora himalayensis  – India
Phyllopsora hispaniolae 
Phyllopsora homosekikaica  – Australia
Phyllopsora imshaugii 
Phyllopsora isidiosa 
Phyllopsora lividocarpa  – Peru
Phyllopsora loekoesii 
Phyllopsora magna 
Phyllopsora methoxymicareica  – Australia
Phyllopsora nemoralis 
Phyllopsora neofoliata  – Australia
Phyllopsora neotinica 
Phyllopsora nigrocincta  – Peru
Phyllopsora parvifolia 
Phyllopsora phaeobyssina 
Phyllopsora pocsii 
Phyllopsora pseudocorallina  – Asia; Africa
Phyllopsora pyxinoides 
Phyllopsora rappiana  – Australia
Phyllopsora rosei  – Europe
Phyllopsora sabahana  – Malaysia
Phyllopsora siamensis  – Thailand
Phyllopsora soralifera  – Peru
Phyllopsora subhyalina 
Phyllopsora swinscowii 
Phyllopsora teretiuscula 
Phyllopsora tobagensis

References

Ramalinaceae
Lichen genera
Lecanorales genera
Taxa described in 1894
Taxa named by Johannes Müller Argoviensis